The 2003 Aberdeen City Council election took place on 1 May 2003 to elect members of Aberdeen City Council. The election was the last one using the established 43 single member wards using the plurality (first past the post), before the Local Governance (Scotland) Act 2004.

The results saw the council turn from Labour control to no overall control, with the Liberal Democrats being the largest party.

Election results

Ward results

References

2003
2003 Scottish local elections
21st century in Aberdeen